Earl Gage Jr. (c. 1927 – died July 30, 2017) was an American firefighter. He was the first Black firefighter in San Francisco, California in the United States. He served as the only Black firefighter for 12 years. During his 28-year career, Gage promoted efforts to increase racial diversity.

Biography

Early life

Gage was born in 1926 in Beaumont, Texas. In 1945, Gage's family moved from Texas to San Francisco. He had 2 sisters and 4 brothers. Gage graduated from San Francisco City College and the University of California, Berkeley, with a pre-med focus. He was drafted into the United States Army.

Career

The San Francisco Fire Department hired Gage in 1955. 

Gage experienced racism in his career, especially during the twelve years in which he was the only Black firefighter. In the fire station bunks, firefighters soiled his mattress and threw it away. Crews were assigned rotating beds regularly, and some would refuse to sleep on a mattress used prior by Gage. As a result, Gage had his own mattress that he transported himself to the different stations. As early as 1969, Gage began calling for increased diversity in the department.

He experienced so much racism and many threats from the public, resulting in him moving from fighting fires to serving as director of community services. He was the first Black man to hold a departmental command position. During his work a director, which was supported by San Francisco Mayor Joseph Alioto, he recruited firefighters, including improving the diversity among staff. He hired Robert Demmons, who would become the city's first Black fire chief. He also developed training for entrance exams, loosening requirements to make it easier for recruits to pass the exams after feedback of the tests being too hard. Gage also re-launched two programs: field trips for children to visit fire departments and seasonal holiday decorations at firehouses.

Gage retired, after 28 years, in 1983. Despite his retirement, in 1987 he was named in a consent decree to increase diversity, including both racially and by gender, in the fire department. After retirement, Gage became a real estate broker.

Death and legacy

Gage died on July 30, 2017, in Elk Grove, California. The service was held at the Third Baptist Church in San Francisco.

At Gage's funeral, Sherman Tillman, president of the San Francisco Black Firefighters Association, first proposed the idea of naming a street after Gage. In 2020, the San Francisco Board of Supervisors voted unanimously to rename part of Willow Street after Gage.

Personal life 
In 1952, he married Blondell Wright, whom he converted to Catholicism to wed.

References

2017 deaths
1920s births
American firefighters
20th-century African-American people
21st-century African-American people
People from Beaumont, Texas
People from San Francisco
City College of San Francisco alumni
University of California, Berkeley alumni
United States Army soldiers
American real estate brokers
People from Elk Grove, California
African-American Catholics